Flavobacterium arsenatis  is an arsenic-resistant, Gram-negative and rod-shaped bacterium from the genus of Flavobacterium which has been isolated from high-arsenic sediments from Jianghan Plain in China.

References

 

arsenatis
Bacteria described in 2014